The secretary of state of Alabama is one of the constitutional officers of the U.S. state of Alabama.  The office actually predates the statehood of Alabama, dating back to the Alabama Territory.  From 1819 to 1901, the secretary of state served a two-year term until the State Constitution was changed to set the term to four years. Up until 1868 the secretary of state was elected by the Alabama Legislature, but is now popularly elected.  The terms and over 1,000 duties of the office are defined by Sections 114, 118, 132, and 134 of the Alabama Constitution and throughout the Code of Alabama.

The secretary of state must be at least 25 years old, a U.S. citizen for at least seven years, an Alabama state resident for at least five years, and a registered voter. The secretary of state and governor are on the same election cycle, and may only serve two consecutive terms; to hold the office for more terms, the office must be vacated for at least one term. The governor may appoint a replacement secretary of state in the case of resignation or death.

Organization
The secretary of state's office is organized as follows:
The Executive Division administers the day-to-day operations of the secretary of state's office and also maintains the notaries public database and Civil Law Notaries. 
The Business Services Division of the secretary of state's office is divided into two sections: Business Entities, which operates as a depository for records of domestic entities and foreign entities that have qualified to transact business in Alabama, and Uniform Commercial Code (UCC), which operates a filing and retrieval center for UCC financing statements at the state level.
The Elections Division administers elections and campaign finance laws, including the preparation of ballots and implementation of state and federal election laws (such as the Help America Vote Act).
The Government Support/Authentications & Trademarks Division maintains the distribution of the Acts of Alabama, preserves the use of the state seal, licenses Athlete Agents, oversees trademarking, and authenticates documents with either an apostille or certification. 
The Government Records Section is responsible for maintenance of legislative and other government records, including land titles. The state holds land titles going back to the date of statehood.
The Finance Division works with the Executive Division to discuss budgets and handle transactions with state vendors.
The Information Technology (IT) Division maintains the office's network security and runs the live Elections Night Reporting system during Alabama elections.

The Alabama secretary of state's website also contains a public organizational chart that features a more in-depth depiction of each division and the titles of each staff member therein.

Officeholders
The current secretary of state is Republican Wes Allen from Pike County. Allen was elected secretary of state in November 2022, after serving one term in the Alabama House of Representatives from 2018 to 2022. Allen took office on January 16, 2023, succeeding John Merrill, who was first elected in 2014 and served from 2015 to 2023.

From 1944 to 1979, the office was held by five different women, the first of whom was Sibyl Pool. Agnes Baggett was the longest serving secretary of state, having been elected to three non-consecutive terms.

Notes:
 First native-born Alabamian to serve as Secretary of State.
 Switched to Republican Party in 1998.

References

External links
 
 
 Alabama Secretary of State Business Database Search

 
Politics of Alabama
1818 establishments in Alabama Territory